Funke Opeke is a Nigerian electrical engineer, founder of Main Street Technologies and Chief Executive Officer of Main One Cable Company, a communications services company based in Lagos State, south-western Nigeria.

Education and early life

Funke Opeke attended Queens School (girls only) in Ibadan, Oyo State, Nigeria.
She grew up in Ibadan, the capital city of Oyo State, although, she is a native of Ile- Oluji, Ondo state. Born into a family of 9, her father was the first Nigerian director of the Cocoa Research Institute of Nigeriawhile her mother was a teacher.

Funke Opeke obtained a bachelor's and a master's degree in electrical engineering from Obafemi Awolowo University and Columbia University, respectively. After she graduated from Columbia University, she followed with a career in ICT in the United States as an executive director with the wholesale division of Verizon Communications in New York City. In 2005, she joined MTN Nigeria as chief technical officer (CTO). She served as adviser at Transcorp and chief operating officer of NITEL for a brief period.

MainOne Cable 
After moving back to Nigeria, Funke Opeke started MainOne  in 2008, when she noticed the poor internet connectivity in Nigeria. MainOne is West Africa's leading communication services and network solutions provider. The  company built West Africa's first privately owned, open access 7,000-kilometer undersea high capacity cable submarine stretching from Portugal to West Africa with landings along the route in Accra (Ghana), Dakar (Senegal) in 2019, Abidjan (Côte d'Ivoire) in 2019 and Lagos (Nigeria). Her desire to add value to her home country birthed Africa's biggest cable company. After pledging all her savings, facing more challenges of raising capital for the start-up cable business, carrying out in-depth foundational works, feasibility studies, business plans, and technical plans, Main One Cable Company become more tangible. In 2015, her company started operations of what is reputed to be Nigeria's largest Tier III Data Center, also extending a submarine cable from Lagos into Cameroon. Her achievements are a source of inspiration to many. Funke is the inventor of Mainstreet Technologies, the developer of MainOne cable, a leading provider in West Africa.

References

Living people
21st-century Nigerian businesswomen
21st-century Nigerian businesspeople
Nigerian motivational speakers
Nigerian philanthropists
Nigerian women company founders
Nigerian women engineers
Nigerian expatriates in the United States
Obafemi Awolowo University alumni
Columbia School of Engineering and Applied Science alumni
Women chief executives
21st-century women engineers
Year of birth missing (living people)